Bulbophyllum ankylochele is a species of orchid in the genus Bulbophyllum.

References

External links 
 
 
 The Bulbophyllum-Checklist
 The Internet Orchid Species Photo Encyclopedia

ankylochele